Michael James Thistle (born 5 August 1980) is an Australian cricketer who previously played several matches for Western Australia in domestic competitions.

Career
From Perth, Thistle first played for the state second XI during the 2000–01 season, and later attended the Australian Cricket Academy. A right-arm fast bowler, he did not make his debut at state level until the 2003–04 season, when he played two limited-overs matches in the ING Cup and a single first-class in the Pura Cup. On his one-day debut, he took 3/32, including the wicket of John Davison with his second ball. These were to be Thistle's only matches at state level, although he did play several second XI games the following season. He spent the 2005 English cricket season playing for Havant in the Southern Premier Cricket League, and also played several matches for Hampshire's team in the Second XI Championship. In the WACA district competition, Thistle plays for Bayswater–Morley.

References

1980 births
Australian cricketers
Living people
Cricketers from Perth, Western Australia
Western Australia cricketers
Sportsmen from Western Australia